Professor Ragunathar Kanagasuntheram (13 October 1919 – 19 June 2010) was a Sri Lankan Tamil physician, zoologist, academic and dean of the Faculty of Medicine at the University of Jaffna.

Early life and family
Kanagasuntheram was born on 13 October 1919 in Karainagar in northern Ceylon. He was the son of Ragunathar, a teacher from Karainagar. He was educated at Karainagar Hindu College and Jaffna Hindu College. After school he joined Ceylon Medical College in 1938. He graduated from the University of Ceylon in 1944 with a first class honours MBBS degree and was awarded the Rockwood Gold Medal. He passed the part 1 of the Fellowship of the Royal College of Surgeons exam in 1947 but did not sit the part 2 exam due to health reasons.

Kanagasuntheram married Sornam. They had two sons (Narendran and Rajendran) and three daughters (Pathmini, Bhavani and Panja).

Career
Kanagasuntheram joined the University of Ceylon, Colombo as a lecturer in anatomy in 1948. He then proceeded to the University of Cambridge from where he received a PhD degree in 1952. He won colours at Cambridge in tennis.

Kanagasuntheram then worked at the University of Khartoum from 1958 and 1962 as a senior lecturer and reader of anatomy. He was appointed Professor of Anatomy and head of the Department of Anatomy at the University of Singapore in 1962. He was the first Asian to chair the department. He retired in 1979 and was appointed emeritus professor in 1981. He was visiting professor at Flinders University.

Kanagasuntheram was Professor of Anatomy and head of the Department of Anatomy at the University of Jaffna. He was dean of the Faculty of Medicine at the university from July 1981 to December 1983.

Kanagasuntheram became a member of the Anatomical Society of Great Britain and Ireland in 1951, and later on was made a life member. He was a fellow of the Zoological Society of London, fellow of the Institute of Biology and a member of the Academy of Medicine of Singapore. He was awarded an honorary doctorate from the University of Jaffna.

The National University of Singapore has named a bursary in honour of Kanagasuntheram.

Later life
Kanagasuntheram returned to Singapore. He died on 19 June 2010 in Adelaide, Australia.

Works
 A New Approach to Dissection of the Human Body: A Thirty Week Schedule Incorporating the Objective Method of Learning by R. Kanagasuntheram, P. Sivanandasigham and A. Krishnamurti (1977, Singapore University Press)
 Anatomy: Regional, Functional and Clinical by R. Kanagasuntheram, P. Sivanandasigham and A. Krishnamurti (1987, PG Medical Books)
 A New Approach of the Human Body by R. Kanagasuntheram and P. Sivanandasigham (1988, PG Publishing)
 Textbook of Anatomy by R. Kanagasuntheram, P. Sivanandasigham and A. Krishnamurti (1996, Sangam Books)

References

1919 births
2010 deaths
Academic staff of the University of Ceylon
Academic staff of the University of Jaffna
Alumni of Ceylon Medical College
Alumni of Jaffna Hindu College
Alumni of the University of Cambridge
Alumni of the University of Ceylon
Fellows of the Zoological Society of London
Academic staff of Flinders University
Academic staff of the National University of Singapore
People from Northern Province, Sri Lanka
People from British Ceylon
Sri Lankan Tamil academics
Sri Lankan Tamil physicians
Sri Lankan Tamil writers
Sri Lankan Tamil zoologists
Academic staff of the University of Khartoum
Sri Lankan environmentalists
Expatriates in Sudan
Expatriates in Singapore